The 2017–18 LEB Plata season was the 18th season of the Spanish basketball third league. It started on 29 September 2017 with the first round of the regular season and ended on 5 June 2018 with the final.

Teams

Promotion and relegation (pre-season)
A total of 16 teams contested the league, including 10 sides from the 2016–17 season, two relegated from the 2016–17 LEB Oro and four promoted from the 2016–17 Liga EBA. On July 18, 2017, Torrons Vicens CB L'Hospitalet, Arcos Albacete Basket, CB Extremadura Plasencia and Baskonia B achieved the vacancies of Zornotza ST, CB Clavijo, Marín Peixegalego and Seguros Soliss Alcázar Basket.

Teams relegated from LEB Oro
CB Clavijo (remained in LEB Oro as Sáenz Horeca Araberri did not fulfill the requirements to play in LEB Oro)
Marín Peixegalego (did not fulfill the requirements)

Teams promoted from Liga EBA
Real Murcia Baloncesto
CB Martorell
Real Canoe NC
Fundación Globalcaja La Roda

Teams relegated to Liga EBA
Torrons Vicens CB L'Hospitalet (remained in the league achieving a vacant berth)
CB Tarragona
Arcos Albacete Basket (remained in the league achieving a vacant berth)
Hispagan UPB Gandia

Teams that did not fulfill the requirements
Zornotza ST
Seguros Soliss Alcázar Basket

Teams that applied to participate
CB Extremadura Plasencia
Baskonia B

Venues and locations

Regular season

League table

Positions by round
The table lists the positions of teams after completion of each round. In order to preserve chronological evolvements, any postponed matches are not included in the round at which they were originally scheduled, but added to the full round they were played immediately afterwards. For example, if a match is scheduled for round 13, but then postponed and played between rounds 16 and 17, it will be added to the standings for round 16.
Source: FEB

Results

Playoffs

Source: FEB

Copa LEB Plata
The Copa LEB Plata was played on 27 January 2018, by the two first qualified teams after the end of the first half of the season (round 15). The champion of the cup would have played the playoffs as first qualified if it has finished the league between the second and the fifth qualified.

Teams qualified

Game

Final standings

Awards
All official awards of the 2017–18 LEB Plata season.

MVP

Source:

All-LEB Plata Team

Source:

Copa LEB Plata MVP

Source:

Best Coach

Source:

Player of the round

Regular season

Source: FEB

Quarter-finals

Source: FEB

Semi-finals

Source: FEB

Final

Source: FEB

References and notes

External links
 Official website 

LEB2
LEB Plata seasons